The Sal is a river on the Black Sea–Caspian Steppe of southern Russia, a left tributary to the river Don. Its source is in the western part of the Russian republic Kalmykia. It rises just west of Elista, flows north, turns and flows west between the rivers Don and Manych. It is separated from the Manych by the low Sal-Manych Rise. It joins the river Don near Semikarakorsk. Maximum flow is during the March–April snowmelt. It is much used for irrigation.

References

Rivers of Rostov Oblast
Rivers of Kalmykia